Jacquemart may refer to:

People:
Jacquemart de Hesdin (c. 1355– c. 1414), French painter 
Henri Alfred Jacquemart (1824-1896), French sculptor
Nélie Jacquemart (fl. late 19th century), painter & collector

Other:
Jacquemart (bellstriker)
Jacquemart Island, in New Zealand
Musée Jacquemart-André, Paris art museum